Speak Clearly is the debut EP of Purr Machine, released in March 1999 by Re-Constriction Records.

Reception
Aiding & Abetting gave Speak Clearly a positive review, saying "There's a reason for this disc. These remixes take the basic Purr Machine idea and connect it to other nodes in the universe. Precisely what this sort of single is supposed to do."

Track listing

Personnel
Adapted from the Speak Clearly liner notes.

Purr Machine
 Kirk Hellie – guitar
 Kevin Kipnis – bass guitar, programming
 Betsy Martin – lead vocals

Release history

References

External links 
 
 Speak Clearly at Discogs (list of releases)

1999 debut EPs
Purr Machine albums
Re-Constriction Records EPs